Scotch Lake may refer to:
 Scotch Lake, New Brunswick, Canada
 Scotch Lake, Nova Scotia, Canada
 Scotch Lake, in Le Sueur County, Minnesota